SAROBMED, the Search and Rescue Observatory for the Mediterranean, was a  consortium of researchers, civil society groups, and other organisations with interests in the field of cross-border maritime migration. The focus was in particular on providing a monitoring system for refugee travel in the Mediterranean Sea.

History
SAROBMED was set up by Dr Violeta Moreno-Lax of Queen Mary University of London. Its website lists incidents documented from 24 April 2017 to 19 January 2019. During this time, its associated researchers produced a number of publications in the field of refugee safety in transit. It made submissions to the United Nations. Its model for monitoring incidents was viewed favourably.

NGO PARTNERS
In addition to researchers from academia, SAROBMED listed the following NGOs as partners:
Médecins Sans Frontières
Jugend Rettet
Sea-Watch
Proactiva Open Arms
Proem-Aid
Mission Lifeline
Salvamento Marítimo Humanitario
Borderline Europe
Refugee Rescue
SOS Méditerranée
Alarm Phone
Sea-Eye
Mare Liberum
The AIRE Centre
Equal Rights

References

External links
 SAROBMED Search and Rescue Observatory for the Mediterranean: Home page

European migrant crisis
Migration-related organizations
2017 establishments in the United Kingdom